"Chez moi" is a song by French singer and songwriter Serge Lama. It was released in 1974 (as a single and on his album titled Chez moi).

Composition and writing 
The song was written by Serge Lama and composed by Alice Dona.

Commercial performance 
The single reached the top 15 in France (according to the data compiled by Centre d'information et de documentation du disque).

Track listing 
7" single Philips 6009 500 (1974, France etc.)
 A. "Chez moi" (3:45)
 B. "La braconne" (3:30)

Awards 
 1975 : Prix Vincent-Scotto

References

External links 
 Serge Lama – "Chez moi" (single) on Discogs

1974 songs
1974 singles
French songs
Serge Lama songs
Songs written by Serge Lama
Philips Records singles
Songs written by Alice Dona